Lecchi di Staggia is a village in Tuscany, central Italy, in the comune of Poggibonsi, province of Siena. At the time of the 2001 census its population was 159.

Lecchi is about 27 km from Siena and 6 km from Poggibonsi.

References 

Frazioni of Poggibonsi